The WAGGGS-Western Hemisphere Region is the divisional office of the World Association of Girl Guides and Girl Scouts, which services Guiding and Scouting in North and South America.

This region is the counterpart of the Interamerican Region of the World Organization of the Scout Movement (WOSM).

External links 
https://www.wagggs.org/en/our-world/western-hemisphere/

World Association of Girl Guides and Girl Scouts